Koutsis is a Greek surname. Notable people with the surname include:

Giorgos Koutsis (born 1973), Greek footballer
Ioannis Koutsis (1860−1953), Greek painter
Ioannis Koutsis (1908−unknown), Greek Olympic sports shooter

Greek-language surnames
Surnames